Mwasumbia is a monotypic genus of flowering plants belonging to the family Annonaceae. The only known species is Mwasumbia alba.

It is native to Tanzania.

The genus name of Mwasumbia is in honour of Leonard B. Mwasumbi (b.1938), a Tanzanian botanist, plant taxonomist, specialist in Tanzanian flora, and former head of the Herbarium at the University of Dar es Salaam.

The genus was circumscribed by Thomas Louis Pierre Couvreur and David Mark Johnson in Syst. Bot. vol.34 (Issue 2) on page 268 and 270 in 2009.

The Latin specific epithet alba (of the species) means “white”, referring to the white flowers.

References

Annonaceae
Annonaceae genera
Monotypic magnoliid genera
Flora of Tanzania